Cornigamasus is a genus of mites in the family Parasitidae.

Species
 Cornigamasus coleoptratorum      
 Cornigamasus imitans Athias-Henriot, 1980     
 Cornigamasus lunariformis Athias-Henriot, 1980     
 Cornigamasus lunarioides Athias-Henriot, 1980     
 Cornigamasus lunaris (Berlese, 1882)     
 Cornigamasus oulaensis Ma, 1986     
 Cornigamasus ocliferius Skorupski & Witalinski, 1997     
 Cornigamasus quasilunaris Athias-Henriot, 1980

References

Parasitidae